Alhola is a Finnish television comedy series that aired in 1991.

Cast
Lassi – Esko Varonen
Unni – Hannu Raatikainen
Manu – Petteri Rajanti
Pauli – Markku Peltola
Väinö Nesiä - Veikko Mylly
Ellen Nesiä - Eeva-Liisa Haimelin
Petteri Nesiä - Lasse Karkjärvi
Kekki - Eero Saarinen
Korpela - Raimo O. Niemi
Marokkolainen tarjoilija - Henry Hanikka
Tädit - Vappu Jurkka, Mervi Nuora, Ragni Grönblom, Sari Tirkkonen, Eira Jauckens and Meri Pakarinen
Pasi-Arton – Outi Mäenpää
Seppo Sillanpää

See also
List of Finnish television series

External links
 

Finnish comedy television series
1991 Finnish television series debuts
1991 Finnish television series endings
1990s Finnish television series
Yle original programming